Petar Raković (Serbian Cyrillic: Петар Раковић; born 17 February 1984) is a retired Serbian footballer and Serbian national youth team member who spent most of the career playing in United States, Norway, and Serbia top division. Raković played alongside Dušan Basta, Boško Janković, Dejan Milovanović, Dragan Mrđa and Nemanja Obrić in the class of 1984 in one of the best classes in the history of the Red Star Belgrade youth system. In 2003, he was loaned to FK Radnički Kragujevac where he started every game in the season.

College career
Alongside MLS goalkeeper Milos Kočić, Raković signed a national letter of intent to St. John's University, New York City, United States, in May 2005. He was a member of the 2006 St.John's University men's soccer team that went on a 20 days trip to Vietnam becoming the first intercollegiate team to visit the Vietnamese soil after the war. In a game against Vietnamese Premier League team FC Mitsustar Raković scored a nice goal from 30 yards to tie the match 2-2. In 2006, he won the championship ring of the Big East Conference.

In the winter of 2007 Raković transferred to Stony Brook University, Long Island, New York. In the first season at the Seawolves, he became the captain of the team. He scored 2 goals in the 2007 season and lead the team in assists with 6.

Professional career
Following graduation from Stony Brook University majoring in economics and math, Raković signed for FK Rad with Milan Borjan, Andrija Kaluđerović, and Bojan Brnović. During summer window, He moved to Norway making his debut for Mjøndalen in Norway Adeccoligaen in the game against Tromsdalen on 8 September 2009.

Raković played for Red Star Belgrade as a youth player. He has previously played for FK Obilić and KFK Radnički Kragujevac in Serbia and St. John's University and Stony Brook University (US College soccer) in the US, as well as for the FK Rad.

External links
 https://www.youtube.com/watch?v=drz_COXkO2w (highlight video from 2010)
 
 Petar Raković site
 Profile at Srbijafudbal
 Profile at Stony Brook official site
 Short career story at FK Rad Belgrade official site, when he was on probe there in January 2009. 

1984 births
Living people
Sportspeople from Kragujevac
Serbian footballers
Serbian expatriate footballers
FK Obilić players
FK Radnički 1923 players
FK Radnički Obrenovac players
Expatriate footballers in Norway
Association football defenders